Ahmed Mejjati (born in Casablanca in 1936 – October 1995) was an influential Moroccan avant-garde poet.

Biography
Mejjati studied in Damascus and completed his PhD in Arabic literature at the Mohammed V University in Rabat, where he also worked as a professor of Arabic literature.

He won the Ibn Zaydoun Award for poetry in Madrid in 1985, and the Prix du Maroc du livre in 1987.

Work
Mejjati's poetry is characterized by its emphasis on pure Arabic diction and original syntactic formation. He published poems in magazines, but only one book of poetry:Al Fouroussiya (Chivalry).

The Syrian critic Mohammed Mohi Eddine called Mejjati's poem Assouqout one of the most beautiful poems in the Arabic language.

References

External links
Poetry International web  (retrieved Feb. 12, 2009)

Bibliography
Al Fouroussiya (Chivalry), ed. Publications of the national council for Arab culture, Rabat, 1987
 Ahmad Al Maggati Poète d'avant-garde marocain, thèse de doctorat d'Etat soutenue à Aix-Marseille, 1988

20th-century Moroccan poets
1936 births
1995 deaths
People from Casablanca
20th-century poets
Mohammed V University alumni
Academic staff of Mohammed V University